French punk is punk rock from France. Punk rock developed in France in the mid-1970s, strongly influenced by the scenes in the United States and United Kingdom, but also influencing the latter. The first European Punk Rock Festival took place at Mont-de-Marsan in France in August 1976.

History

The 1970s

By the early 1970s, Les punks, a Parisian subculture of Lou Reed fans, had already become well established. Initially, two central figures were Marc Zermati, who had founded Skydog Records in Paris in 1972, owned the Open Market record shop, and promoted American and British bands in France; and Michel Esteban, the owner of the Harry Cover rock merchandise shop and founder of Rock News magazine, who had associated with leading punk and new wave musicians in New York City. The first European Punk Rock Festival, organised by Zermati, took place at Mont-de-Marsan on 21 August 1976, and featured French bands Bijou, Il Biaritz and Shakin’ Street, as well as The Damned.

Zermati later said: "The real punk movement started in New York, and Paris came before the UK because we were really connected to New York... it was exciting because we thought we were conspiring against the establishment." He also claimed that he persuaded Malcolm McLaren to call the movement "punk" rather than McLaren's preferred term, "new wave". An important influence on the style and content of the movement in the UK was the French Situationist movement, led by Guy Debord.

Formed in 1976, Métal Urbain and Stinky Toys were two of the first French punk bands, although at the time most French punk fans preferred English or American punk. Generally regarded as the most original of the early French punk bands, Métal Urbain gave their first performance in December 1976. In August 1977, Asphalt Jungle played at the second Mont-de-Marsan punk festival. Stinky Toys' debut single, "Boozy Creed", came out in September 1977 and was perhaps the first non-English-language punk rock record. The following month, Métal Urbain's first 45, "Panik", appeared. After the release of their minimalist punk debut, "Rien à dire", Marie et les Garçons became involved in New York's mutant disco scene, encouraged by Esteban at ZE Records. Asphalt Jungle's "Deconnection" (feat. Best Magazine critic Patrick Eudeline on vocals), Gasoline's "Killer Man", and Factory's "Flesh" also came out before the end of 1977, and other French punk acts such as Oberkampf and Starshooter soon formed.

Other French groups formed, such as Abject and Dentist in Nice, Strychnine in Bordeaux, Starshooter in Lyon. In London, French all-girl group The Lou's were part of the scene, as well as Private Vices, who featured three French members out of four, including Bruno Blum, who at the time wrote for influential French rock magazine Best. Most of these early groups, including Les Olivensteins and The Dogs, can be heard on the 1984 Les Plus Grands Succès du Punk (Skydog) double CD anthology.

The 1980s and later
More and more punk rock groups appeared in France during the 1980s, such as Ludwig von 88 and Bérurier Noir. These bands are two of the most famous punk rock groups in France. Les Wampas appeared during the 1980s but had more success in the 2000s.

During the 1990s Noir Désir became one of the most famous bands in French rock. Their style is a mix between punk rock and grunge. The band Mano Negra also had worldwide success.

During the 2000s there became more and more hardcore punk groups, like Guerilla Poubelle or Tagada Jones. The most successful group from the 2000s is Les Wampas with the songs Manu Chao and Chirac en Prison.

French Punk Bands

In the 1970s
Asphalt Jungle
Edith Nylon
Fatsy Wataire
Les Olivensteins
Marie et les Garçons
Métal Urbain
Starshooter
Stinky Toys
Dentist
Private Vices
Extrabelle

In the 1980s
Les Garçons Bouchers
Lucrate Milk
Ludwig von 88
Gogol Premier
Noir Désir 
Oberkampf
OTH
Les Sheriffs
La Souris Déglinguée
Les Thugs
Les Wampas
Tulaviok
Parabellum
Bérurier Noir
Camera Silens

In the 1990s
La Ruda Salska
Les Sales Majestés
Les Vieilles Salopes
Tagada Jones
Zabriskie Point

In the 2000s
The Decline!
Uncommonmenfrommars
Nina'School
Cartouche
Justin(e)
Guerilla Poubelle
Charly Fiasco
Paris Violence
Wank For Peace
Maladroit
Dirty Fonzy
Goat Cheese
Dissidence Radio
Topsy Turvy's
The Helltons
Mind The Gap
Serie Z

In the 2010s 
Hightower
Intenable

References

Punk by country
French youth culture
Punk rock